The 1998 Individual Speedway Junior World Championship was the 22nd edition of the World motorcycle speedway Under-21 Championships. The event was won by Robert Dados of Poland and he also gained qualification to 1999 Speedway Grand Prix.

World final
August 1, 1998
 Piła

References

1998
World I J
Speedway competitions in Poland
1998 in Polish speedway